Her Mad Night is a 1932 American pre-Code crime film directed by E. Mason Hopper and starring Conway Tearle, Irene Rich and Mary Carlisle. It is also known by the title Held For Murder.

Cast
 Conway Tearle as Steven Kennedy  
 Irene Rich as Joan Manners  
 Mary Carlisle as Constance 'Connie' Kennedy  
 Kenneth Thomson as Schuyler Durkin  
 William B. Davidson as District Attorney  
 William Irving as Jury Foreman

References

Bibliography
 Pitts, Michael R. Poverty Row Studios, 1929-1940. McFarland & Company, 2005.

External links
 

1932 films
1932 crime films
American crime films
Films directed by E. Mason Hopper
American black-and-white films
Mayfair Pictures films
1930s English-language films
1930s American films